The Antigua & Barbuda Electoral Commission is the non-partisan entity responsible for administering all elections in Antigua and Barbuda.

History
The Antigua and Barbuda Electoral Commission was established on 3 December 2001, after the Commonwealth Observer Group recommended the creation of an independent electoral commission. The inaugural chairman was McClin Mathias.

Structure
The chairman is nominated by the prime minister, after negotiation with the leader of the opposition. The deputy chairman is nominated by the leader of the opposition after negotiation with the prime minister. There are two members nominated by the prime minister, one nominated by the leader of the opposition, one nominated by the Antigua Christian Council and the United Evangelical Association of Antigua and Barbuda, and one nominated by the Antigua and Barbuda Chamber of Commerce and Industry and the Antigua and Barbuda Employers' Federation.

References

Elections in Antigua and Barbuda
Election commissions
2001 establishments in Antigua and Barbuda